Knyszyn Forest Landscape Park, also known as Puszcza Knyszyńska Landscape Park (Park Krajobrazowy Puszczy Knyszyńskiej) is a protected area (landscape park) in Knyszyn Forest which is located Podlaskie Voivodeship of northeastern Poland.

Geography

It was established in 1988, and is a Natura 2000 EU Special Protection Area.

The landscape park contains 20 nature reserves.

Counties and Gminas
The natural Landscape Park is within Podlaskie Voivodeship, and is located in: 
Białystok County in Gmina Czarna Białostocka, Gmina Gródek, Gmina Michałowo, Gmina Supraśl, and Gmina Wasilków
Mońki County in Gmina Knyszyn
Sokółka County in Gmina Sokółka, Gmina Janów, Gmina Krynki, and Gmina Szudziałowo

See also

Special Protection Areas in Poland

References

Landscape parks in Poland
Parks in Podlaskie Voivodeship
Natura 2000 in Poland
Białystok County
Mońki County
Sokółka County
1988 establishments in Poland
Protected areas established in 1988
Forests of Poland